Startin' Somethin' is the first and only album by Scandal'us, the winners of the second series of the Australian version of the talent program Popstars. It was released on 7 May 2001 and reached number two on the Australian Albums Chart.

History
Startin' Somethin''' was recorded in early 2001 while the Popstars'' program was airing on the Seven Network, and the show included footage of the group in the recording studio, laying down vocals for songs. It was the group's only album before disbanding.

Track listing

Charts

Weekly charts

Year-end charts

Certification

References

2000 debut albums
Scandal'us albums